Sazandegi is an Iranian daily newspaper first published in 2018.

History 
It was edited by Mohammad Ghouchani. In June 2021, Sazandegi was sued by Mohammad Bagher Ghalibaf for featuring an illustration of him the its cover. The portrait was based on a photography of the politician wiping sweat from his balding forehead.

Political alignment 
Sazandegi is reformist and the official organ of the Executives of Construction Party.

References 

2018 establishments in Iran
Newspapers published in Tehran
Persian-language newspapers
Publications established in 2018